St. Dominic High School is a private Roman Catholic high school in O'Fallon, Missouri. It is located in the Roman Catholic Archdiocese of Saint Louis.

History 

St. Dominic was established in 1962, replacing Assumption High School, which was closed due to deteriorating facilities. In response to growing enrollment, a 13-classroom addition, new library, and enlarged cafeteria were completed in 2000. Then in 2010, St. Dominic High School completed the addition of a multipurpose building which includes a gym, locker rooms, weight room, and a performing arts center.

St. Dominic High School has been part of Catholic Secondary education for more than 90 years (St. Dominic High School). Assumption High School began in 1929. St. Dominic High School was a secondary education that was a vision set for young people in the area. The school was staffed by the Sisters of the most Precious Blood. When the school first started, classes took place in a white school house until 1955. By 1961 the increasing enrollment became too much for the small school. The Catholic high school petitioned the archdiocese for assistance with the help of the archdiocese. St. Dominic High School was able to build a new facility for students. It is now a regional high school serving more than eleven parishes.	The school changed its name from assumption to St. Dominic because they wanted to show their gratitude to the Dominican congregation of our Lady of the Rosary. St. Dominic opened on September 4, 1962, but the first classes were held in the old Assumption building, while the new building and classes were being built. Students began attending the new St. Dominic High School in September 1963. In 2000, a new wing was built that included eighteen classrooms and a bigger library. Then in 2004, “Crusader Stadium” was built.

History of Staff 
At one point in time St. Dominic had thirteen Dominican sisters work there. The last Dominican sister to leave, after serving 45 years, was Sr. Jeanne Margaret. The school is staffed by School Sisters of Notre Dame, an archdiocesan priest, and dedicated laymen and women. The school is accredited by the north central association of colleges and universities. The four pillars of the Dominican order are prayer, study, community, and service.  St. Dominic High School encourages its students, to have lifelong growth in faith, knowledge, leadership, and involvement.  St. Dominic encourages their students to be involved, which includes sports.

Athletics 
St. Dominic offers different sports. Boys have basketball, soccer, golf, tennis, football, volleyball, track and field and baseball. Girls have soccer, basketball, track and field, softball, field hockey, tennis, swimming, dance, golf, lacrosse, and cheerleading. In 2011, the girls were the Class 4 Basketball State Champions. The boys soccer team won state in 2004, 2008, and 2009, and the baseball team won state in 2008. The girls dance team were 2008–2009 state champions.  In 2012, the Varsity Boys Soccer team won the Class 2 Missouri State Championship. In 2019,2021, and 2022 the women's soccer team won state.

Performing arts 
St. Dominic has had a thriving performing arts department since its inception. The theatre department is well known in St. Charles County for its yearly spring musical and fall play. Melfreya Findley leads the theatre department. In 2018 the school won 
several awards at the Saint Louis High School Musical Theatre Awards, including Best Show. The music department is directed by Greg Cissell, and through his leadership St. Dominic has won several band and choir competitions throughout the country.  In addition to a very successful band and choir group, St. Dominic employs Jazz Band leader Larry Johnson (who is also the band leader for St. Joseph Cottleville Grade School.) In 2009, the parents and alumni created a performing arts support group called PALS (Performing Arts Lovers). This group is much like the Athletic Association in that it raises money to help support and offset costs for the music and theatre departments at St. Dominic.

Philosophy 
St. Dominic believes that every student is sacred, unique, and blessed with many different talents. St. Dominic allows students to use their God-given talents through academic, spiritual, athletic, extracurricular, and service programs. "St. Dominic  High School community believes that each student can become a faith- filled adult aware of the wholeness and richness of life and committed to a life of generosity and service to others."

References

External links 
 School Website

Roman Catholic Archdiocese of St. Louis
Educational institutions established in 1962
1962 establishments in Missouri
Roman Catholic secondary schools in St. Charles County, Missouri